Hear You Me may refer to:

 "Hear You Me", a song on Bleed American, a 2001 album by Jimmy Eat World
 Hear You Me! A Tribute to Mykel and Carli, a 1998 album